Zeuxippus atellanus is a spider species of the jumping spider family, Salticidae. It is found in Burma.

References
  (2000): An Introduction to the Spiders of South East Asia. Malaysian Nature Society, Kuala Lumpur.
  (2009): The world spider catalog, version 9.5. American Museum of Natural History.

Salticidae
Spiders of Asia
Spiders described in 1895